Gael Patricia Mulhall-Martin (born 27 August 1956) is a former Australian athlete who competed in the shot put and in the discus throw at the Olympic level and also had a career in powerlifting.

Athletics

Born in Melbourne, Mulhall-Martin is daughter of footballer Ken Mulhall, an Australian rules footballer with the St Kilda Football Club.

She won the bronze medal in women's shot put at the 1984 Summer Olympics held in Los Angeles, United States, becoming the first Australian (male or female) to win an Olympic medal in a throwing event.

Mulhall also competed in four successive Commonwealth Games events from 1974, winning double gold in Shot Put and Discus at the 1986 Commonwealth Games in Edinburgh.

Coached by Franz Stampfl, she won a total of 20 senior Australian national championships in her career.

At the 1981 Pan Pacific Conference Games she tested positive for the use of anabolic steroids and received an 18-month ban for cheating.

Powerlifting

Gael Martin represented Australia in the Women's World Powerlifting Championships in 1981, 1983 and 1988. In 1987, Martin received a grant from the ACT Talented Athletes Development Awards program. The higher level grant, which Martin received, was awarded to applicants with international ranking and the support of their sporting organisation.

Footnotes

References
 Farber, M., "Drugs hurt career of Aussie woman", The (Montreal) Gazette, (Monday, 4 October 1982), p.F-5
 Goodwin, D., "Gael's firm — 'I'm not a drug taker' ", (Sydney) Sun Herald, (Sunday, 16 August 1981), p. 17
 Mitchell, N. and McMahon, P., "Mulhall may take life ban to court", The Age, (Wednesday, 15 July 1981), p. 36
 Nolan, D., "Gael is hoping to throw for gold", The Australian Women's Weekly, (Wednesday, 21 March 1979), p. 29
 Webster, J., "Mulhall to start her comeback on Saturday", The Sydney Morning Herald, Wednesday, 28 July 1982, p. 40
 1973 photograph of Mulhall with Ray Rigby at an athletic meeting.

External links 
 
 

1956 births
Living people
Athletes from Melbourne
Sportswomen from Victoria (Australia)
Australian female discus throwers
Australian female shot putters
Australian powerlifters
Female powerlifters
Olympic athletes of Australia
Olympic bronze medalists for Australia
Olympic bronze medalists in athletics (track and field)
Athletes (track and field) at the 1980 Summer Olympics
Athletes (track and field) at the 1984 Summer Olympics
Medalists at the 1984 Summer Olympics
Commonwealth Games gold medallists for Australia
Commonwealth Games silver medallists for Australia
Commonwealth Games medallists in athletics
Athletes (track and field) at the 1974 British Commonwealth Games
Athletes (track and field) at the 1978 Commonwealth Games
Athletes (track and field) at the 1982 Commonwealth Games
Athletes (track and field) at the 1986 Commonwealth Games
Australian Institute of Sport track and field athletes
Doping cases in Australian track and field
Medallists at the 1978 Commonwealth Games
Medallists at the 1986 Commonwealth Games